Ranjit Gupta may refer to:

 Ranjit Kumar Gupta -  Kolkata police commissioner, who played an important role during the Naxalite movement 
 Ranajit Gupta – ICS officer, chief secretary of West Bengal, elder brother of Indrajit Gupta
 Ranjit Gupta (sports administrator)  – joint secretary of Indian Football Association
 Ranjit Gupta (diplomat) - India's Ambassador to Yemen, Venezuela, Sultanate of Oman, Thailand, Spain and Head of Office in Taiwan